Orinda station is a Bay Area Rapid Transit station in Orinda, California. The station has an island platform in the center median of State Route 24. Service at the station began on May 21, 1973, following the completion of the Berkeley Hills Tunnel, which connects it to Rockridge station. An abstract mural by Win Ng, partially covered by advertisements, is located in the fare lobby.

In 2008, BART added solar panels over parking areas at Orinda station, as well as the Richmond and Hayward maintenance yards. The $3.8 million project was expected to provide all station electrical needs during daylight hours.

The elevator to the platform is outside of the paid area. BART plans to add a dedicated faregate for the elevator in 2022.

Notes

External links 

BART — Orinda

Bay Area Rapid Transit stations in Contra Costa County, California
Orinda, California
Stations on the Yellow Line (BART)
Railway stations in the United States opened in 1973
1973 establishments in California